Neodiplocampta is a genus of bee flies in the family Bombyliidae. There are about 17 described species in Neodiplocampta.

Species
These 17 species belong to the genus Neodiplocampta:

 Neodiplocampta astrella Hull & Martin, 1974 i c g b
 Neodiplocampta brasiliana Hull & Martin, 1974 c g
 Neodiplocampta caliginosa Tabet and Hall, 1987 i c g
 Neodiplocampta decemmacula (Walker, 1857) c
 Neodiplocampta garaguaya Hull & Martin, 1974 c g
 Neodiplocampta krombeini Hull & Martin, 1974 c g
 Neodiplocampta laurella Hull & Martin, 1974 c g
 Neodiplocampta mira Coquillett, 1887 c g b
 Neodiplocampta miranda Hull & Martin, 1974 i c g b
 Neodiplocampta mirella Hull & Martin, 1974 i c g b
 Neodiplocampta mirus (Coquillett, 1887) i c
 Neodiplocampta painteri Hull & Martin, 1974 c g
 Neodiplocampta paradoxa (Jaennicke, 1867) i c g
 Neodiplocampta parva (Loew, 1869) c g
 Neodiplocampta roederi (Curran, 1931) c
 Neodiplocampta sepia Hull, 1966 c g
 Neodiplocampta spiloptera (Wiedemann, 1828) c g

Data sources: i = ITIS, c = Catalogue of Life, g = GBIF, b = Bugguide.net

References

Further reading

 

Bombyliidae
Articles created by Qbugbot
Bombyliidae genera